Chris Brooks (born February 5, 1987) is a former American football wide receiver. He was signed by the Tampa Bay Buccaneers as an undrafted free agent in 2010. He played college football at Nebraska.

Brooks also played for the Indianapolis Colts.

Professional career

Tampa Bay Buccaneers
After going undrafted in the 2010 NFL Draft, Brooks signed with the Tampa Bay Buccaneers as an undrafted free agent on May 3, 2010. He was cut on August 26, 2010.

Indianapolis Colts
Brooks was signed to the Indianapolis Colts practice squad on September 29, 2010. He was promoted to the active roster and played on November 14, 2010. He was cut three days later on November 17, 2010 and re-signed to the practice squad. He was signed to a future contract on January 11, 2011. Brooks was waived during final cuts on September 3, 2011, and re-signed to the Colts' practice squad the following day. He was released on September 13.

References

External links
Nebraska Cornhuskers bio
Indianapolis Colts bio
NFL.com bio
ESPN.com bio

1987 births
Living people
Sportspeople from Missouri
Players of American football from Missouri
American football wide receivers
Nebraska Cornhuskers football players
Indianapolis Colts players